Sylvia Ann Hewlett (born 1946) is a Cambridge educated economist.

Education 
Hewlett graduated from Girton College, Cambridge, was a Kennedy Scholar and then earned her PhD degree in economics at the University of London.

Career 
Hewlett has taught at Cambridge, Columbia and Princeton Universities and held fellowships at the Institute for Public Policy Research in London and the Center for the Study of Values in Public Life at Harvard.

She is the CEO of Hewlett Consulting Partners and founding president of the Center for Talent Innovation a non-profit think tank, based in New York, focusing on women, minorities and previously excluded minority groups. As of 2012, she has been involved in the Gender and Policy Program at the School of International and Public Affairs at Columbia University and serves as a member of the Council on Foreign Relations and the World Economic Forum Council on Women's Empowerment.

In the 1980s, she was the first woman to head up the Economic Policy Council of the United Nations Association—a think tank composed of 125 business and labor leaders.

She is the author of several books (see Bibliography section). Her articles have been published in the New York Times, the Financial Times, strategy+business magazine, and the Harvard Business Review. TV appearances include 60 Minutes, The Today Show, Good Morning America, Newshour with Jim Lehrer, Charlie Rose, NewsNight with Aaron Brown, NBC Nightly News, Oprah, The View, All Things Considered, Talk of the Nation, On Point, and has been lampooned on Saturday Night Live.

Hewlett was awarded the 2014 HR Magazine "Most Influential International Thinker".

Bibliography

Books
 When the Bough Breaks: The Cost of Neglecting Our Children (1991) 
 Child Neglect in Rich Nations (1993)  ebook
 A Lesser Life: The Myth of Women's Liberation in America (1996) 
 The War Against Parents (co-authored with Cornel West) (1998) 
 Creating A Life: What Every Woman Needs to Know About Having a Baby and a Career (2002) 
 Off-Ramps and On-Ramps: Keeping Talented Women on the Road to Success (2007) 
 Top Talent: Keeping Performance Up When Business is Down (2009) 
 Forget a Mentor, Find a Sponsor: The New Way to Fast-Track Your Career (2013) 
 Executive Presence: The Missing Link Between Merit and Success (2014) 
The Sponsor Effect: How to be a Better Leader by Investing in Others (2019) 
MeToo in the Corporate World: Power, Privilege, and the Path Forward (2020)

Articles
 Sylvia Ann Hewlett, Carolyn Buck Luce, and Cornel West. (2005) Leadership in Your Midst: Tapping the Hidden Strengths of Minority Executives. 
 Sylvia Ann Hewlett, Carolyn Buck Luce. (2006) Extreme Jobs: The Dangerous Allure of the 70-Hour Workweek (HBR OnPoint Enhanced Edition). 
 Sylvia Ann Hewlett, Ripa Rashid, and Laura Sherbin. (2017) How to Keep Perceived Bias from Holding Back High-Potential Employees, strategy+business .

Personal life 
Hewlett was raised in a poor mining valley of South Wales, Great Britain. She is married to Richard and they have five children, with an age span of 25 years. The youngest was born when she was 51. She lives in New York City, in an apartment that overlooks Central Park West. In an article that appeared in The Sunday Times in 2015, she revealed that she begins the day with a cup of tea in bed, brought to her by her husband. She is also a clothes horse who enjoys dressing for success.

References

External links
https://www.talentinnovation.org
 Interviews with Sylvia Ann Hewlett on bigthink.com, June 2009
 "On Point: Keeping Women at Work" (aired Tuesday, May 29, 2007 11-12PM ET)
http://www.sylviaannhewlett.com

Living people
Alumni of Girton College, Cambridge
Alumni of the University of London
Academics of the University of Cambridge
1946 births
Harvard University alumni
Kennedy Scholarships
Columbia University faculty